Vicente T. Cubero (September 28, 1911 – October 22, 1942) also known as Captain Francisco Salazar was a Filipino guerilla commander and a secret agent of the USAFFE. He is considered the national hero of Bohol. He died after he was shot by Japanese forces in Ubujan, Tagbilaran. A memorial was established in Tagbilaran to honor his bravery.

Early life 
Cubero was born on September 28, 1911, at Barrio Carmen, Lanuza, Surigao, his parents were full-bloodied Boholanos, originally from Bohol. His father Isidro Cubero hailed from Loon while his mother, Antonia Tejol, is from Corella. In Cubero's boyhood, they lived in 2 cities before they would migrate and settle in Surigao.

World War II 
Before the war, Cubero was originally an agent of the USAFFE. His job was to spy on pro-Japanese spies based in Bohol. He later boarded a boat bound for Bohol in Macrohon, Leyte in May 1942, made several stops, and disembarked in Bohol in the later part of June 1942. While in Bohol, Salazar met and befriended Lt. Juan "Aning" Relampagos, who led the trading vessel he boarded in Leyte. Relampagos identified himself as a USAFFE officer; Cubero introduced himself as Captain Francisco Salazar, who experienced the same actions with Relampagos. Over the course of the voyage, Salazar eventually revealed his true identity to Relampagos. After landing in Bohol, Salazar served as a secret agent of the USAFFE. He went from place to place incognito or assuming different aliases. Salazar was assigned to manage active combat operations against the Japanese.

The Moalong Ambuscade 
At 7:30 am on September 27, 1942. Salazar was the commanding guerilla following ambuscade.. Two trucks consisting of 70 Japanese soldiers were heard. Some of the Japanese soldiers were undercover while the rest of the Japanese forces were close to their area. Salazar and his men became anxious, and Salazar edorder his men to fire. Some of the armory of the Japanese forces were appropriated and used by Salazar's men. One of the Japanese trucks was blown up and fell into the sea after a grenade was thrown into the driver's seat. Following ambuscade, the Japanese forces were immobilized. They attempted to fight back and hid in different spots to defeat Salazar's forces.

References 

1911 births
1942 deaths
Filipino guerrillas
Filipino casualties of World War II
People from Surigao del Sur
People from Bohol